In 1977 Mercedes-Benz introduced a new van/truck (a.k.a. transporter), called T1 internally.  Other designations were series TN / T1N ("Transporter Neu" / "Transporter 1Neu") and Bremer Transporter, since the vehicle was built in the Transporter-Plant in Bremen, Germany, first. In the years 1983/1984 production went - piece by piece - to the Transporter-Plant-Düsseldorf (city in the Rhineland, Germany). The internal chassis-designations (Baumuster, "BM") are: 601 (2,55-2,8t GVWR), 602 (3,2-3,5t GVWR) and 611 (4,6t GVWR).

Design

The TN/T1 was available as a minibus or fitted with a cargo box body or flat cargo bed. A double cab version was offered in the latter two configurations. Three wheel bases were available, with gross weight ratings ranging from 2.55 to 4.6 tonnes.  Mercedes-Benz-built gasoline or diesel engines were available as powerplant options for the rear-wheel drive chassis. The best known 4x4 Versions of the Mercedes TN/T1 were made by Iglhaut by adjusting parts of the G-Wagen to the TN/T1-chassis.  The TN/T1 van was also used as a campervan conversion, being much larger than the Volkswagen Transporter. In 1995, after 18 years of production, the TN/T1 van series was discontinued, succeeded by the T1N "Sprinter".

In Philippines, Mercedes-Benz T1 rebadged version, Togo Atlas is locally made by Morales Motors. The Atlas also offered as minibus or chassis cab for jeepneys and utility trucks.

History
The TN/T1 van model series included 207 D, 208, 307 D and 308.  They debuted in April 1977. The original line was composed of two engines and four weight classes, as follows:
 207 D, 208 - gross weight  or 
 307 D, 308 - gross weight  or 
 207 D, 307 D - four-cylinder Diesel engine with 2404 cc and  engine OM 616, nearly the same engine as in Mercedes-Benz 240D (W123) and 240GD (460).
 208, 308 - four-cylinder petrol engine with 2307 cc and  engine M 115, nearly the same engine as in Mercedes-Benz 230 -"Lowcompression-Export-Version".

Market share was almost 90% for the Diesel engine and a little more than 10% for the petrol engine. While the petrol engine was mainly used for ambulances, firetrucks, special vans for cold areas, commercial buyers preferred the Diesel engine for its lower fuel consumption and best reliability. In the UK, originally only diesel engines were on offer, but as the British market was 80 percent petrol at the time sales were poor. For 1982 petrol models were added, and sales immediately increased by 80 percent. The body styles were panel van, different versions of window vans, pickup and pickup with double cab.
Already the power outputs for the 4-cylinder engines were very good, so the 307D was one of the fastest 3,5 ton (GVWR) Diesel-Vans in Europe of the late 1970s. Low gearing also meant that the vans were capable pullers, able to make best use of the power available whilst returning surprisingly good fuel economy for the large size and weight of vehicle.

It was the OM 617 engine which was also used in the Mercedes-Benz 300D passenger car and 300GD G-Wagon. Other revisions throughout the production were minor, the OM616 engine having a modified cylinder head and less bore which lowered the capacity from 2404 cc to 2399 cc, but producing slightly more power (72 bhp) and using 5-speed-gearboxes instead of the early 4-speed-versions.

In autumn 1988, two new diesel engines - called OM 601/23 and OM 602/29 - were offered, awarded the "Diesel 1989" award.

After 18 years of production, 970,000 of the Bremer Transporter were produced. In 1995 the Mercedes-Benz T1N Sprinter was launched, replacing the T1.

Models

TN / T1 Diesel (1977-1995)  
 * with automatic transmission only, ** for Belgium only, *** for Italy only.

TN / T1 Petrol (1977-1995)   

TN / T1 Electro (1978-1980?)   

The internal chassis-designations:
601 - 2,55-2,8 t (207 D/208/208 D/209 D/210/210 D)
602 - 3,2-3,5 t (307 D/308/308 D/309 D/310/ 310 D)
611 - 4,6 t (407 D/408 D/409 D/410 D/410)

Engine type:
 601.0/602.0/611.0 - gasoline engine
 601.3/602.3/611.3 - diesel engine 4cyl OM616 or OM601
 601.4/602.4/611.4 - diesel engine 5cyl OM617 or OM602

Body type:
 6XX.X1 - high-bed
 6XX.X2 - low-bed
 6XX.X6 - van (delivery van, box-type)
 6XX.X7 - bus (station wagon)

Wheelbase:
 6XX.XX1/6XX.XX6 - 3050 mm
 6XX.XX2/6XX.XX7 - 3350 mm
 6XX.XX8 - 3700 mm

Example: 601.426 - 209 D/210 D, low bed, wheelbase 3050 mm.

References

Notes

Bibliography

External links

TN
TN
Vans
Vehicles introduced in 1977